Old Town Green Historic District is a national historic district located at Huntington in Suffolk County, New York.  The district which has 14 contributing buildings, is officially located on Park Avenue, but expands west along West Main Street. It is a small residential enclave that includes the town green.  This green contains an oak tree named "Constitution Oak," that was planted on the 200th Anniversary of New York State's ratification of the Constitution of the United States. Seven of the eight dwellings date to the settlement period in 1653. Located in the district are structures such as the Charles Woodhull House, the Dr. Daniel Kissam House Museum, and the Fort Golgotha and the Old Burial Hill Cemetery.

It was added to the National Register of Historic Places in 1985.

References

External links
Old Town Green Historic District (Living Places)

Historic districts on the National Register of Historic Places in New York (state)
Federal architecture in New York (state)
Historic districts in Suffolk County, New York
National Register of Historic Places in Huntington (town), New York